The Redtoothed triggerfish (Odonus niger) is a triggerfish of the tropical Indo-Pacific area, and the sole member of its genus. Some other common names include blue triggerfish, redfang triggerfish, redtoothed filefish, and Niger triggerfish.

Description
Redtoothed Niger Triggerfish are normally deep purple with bluish-green markings on their heads and glowing light blue margins on the tail lobes and fins. Just like other fish in the family Balistidae, the tail is lyre-shaped. The mouth of the triggerfish seems to be grinning and it maintains tiny red teeth that are needle-sharp with two teeth in the upper jaw which can be seen when its mouth is closed. These triggerfish are one of the more peaceful triggers in the family but can become threatening with age and can perform a grunting-type sound. They have the ability to change their color depending on their mood, food, feeding, and water quality from purple to blue and to bluish-green.

Their pectoral fins are quite small; as a result they steer mostly with their dorsal and anal fins, which makes them  very maneuverable, and they also use these fins to move with an exotic type of propulsion reminiscent of a propeller. It is one of the most singular swimming styles in the ocean.

Behavior and diet
Redtoothed triggerfishes may inhabit reef channels or long slopes that have strong water currents. They survive by hiding under between rocks and crevices so they don't get swept away by the water currents. They also may live in the coastal shallow inshore waters at depths of around 30 – 100 feet (9 – 30 meters). Redtoothed triggers are mostly planktivorous eaters. They can form schools and normally feed on zooplankton which gets carried by the currents. Sponges are another part of their diet. They are also known to be carnivorous and can eat many different types of animals such as krill, clams, squid, urchins, and small fish.

Range
The redtoothed triggerfish species live in the widespread Indo-Pacific Ocean and Red Sea. They are found at the African east coast to Marquesas and Society islands. They can also be found as far north as Southern Japan and as far south as the Great Barrier Reef in Australia.

Breeding
These fish have distinct pairing. They meet at mating grounds where males set up their territories. Odonus Nigers build nests to lay their eggs in. The females take care of the eggs while both males and females guard the eggs waiting for them to hatch. While they can breed in the wild, they can not breed in aquariums.

References

External links
 

Balistidae
Fish of Palau

Fish described in 1836